Simpson County is a county located in the south central portion of the U.S. state of Kentucky. As of the 2020 census, the total population was 19,594. Its county seat is Franklin.

History
Simpson County was established in 1819 from Allen, Logan, and Warren Counties.  The county is named for Captain John Simpson, a Kentucky militia officer who fought in Battle of Fallen Timbers in the Northwest Indian War, and was killed during the War of 1812 in the Battle of River Raisin.

Geography
The county is located in the Pennyroyal Plateau region of the state.

Adjacent counties
 Warren County  (north)
 Allen County  (east)
 Sumner County, Tennessee  (southeast)
 Robertson County, Tennessee  (southwest)
 Logan County  (west)

Demographics

As of the census of 2000, there were 16,405 people, 6,415 households, and 4,638 families residing in the county. The racial makeup of the county was 87.84% White, 10.22% Black or African American, 0.17% Native American, 0.55% Asian, 0.06% Pacific Islander, 0.30% from other races, and 0.87% from two or more races. 0.91% of the population were Hispanics or Latinos of any race.

There were 6,415 households, out of which 33.80% had children under the age of 18 living with them, 56.80% were married couples living together, 11.50% had a female householder with no husband present, and 27.70% were non-families. 24.20% of all households were made up of individuals, and 10.40% had someone living alone who was 65 years of age or older. The average household size was 2.52 and the average family size was 2.97.

The age distribution was 26.20% under the age of 18, 8.50% from 18 to 24, 29.20% from 25 to 44, 23.00% from 45 to 64, and 13.10% who were 65 years of age or older. The median age was 36 years. For every 100 females there were 95.30 males. For every 100 females age 18 and over, there were 91.60 males.

The median income for a household in the county was $36,432, and the median income for a family was $42,525. Males had a median income of $32,160 versus $22,667 for females. The per capita income for the county was $17,150. About 8.50% of families and 11.60% of the population were below the poverty line, including 14.00% of those under age 18 and 15.90% of those age 65 or over.

Communities

City
 Franklin (county seat)

Unincorporated communities
 Gold City
 Middleton
 Neosheo
 Prices Mill
 Providence
 Salmons

Politics
In contrast to the Western Coalfield and the eastern part of the Pennyroyal Plateau, Simpson County was not highly pro-Union during the Civil War. Consequently, Simpson was as reliably Democratic as the Jackson Purchase and Bluegrass during the following century: no Republican carried Simpson County until Richard Nixon’s 1972 landslide. As with all of rural Kentucky, the social liberalism of the Democratic Party – rejected by many southern whites – has led to an increase in registered Republicans, and many people registered as Democrats vote for Republican candidates, especially at the national level.  In 2014, of a population of 17,800, there were 12,700 registered voters in Simpson County: 8,040 (63%) were Democrats, 3,587 (28%) were Republican, and 1073 (9%) were unaffiliated or registered with another party.

See also

 National Register of Historic Places listings in Simpson County, Kentucky

References

Sources
 Simpson County, Kentucky, KyGenWeb.
 Simpson County, Kentucky, Kentucky Atlas & Gazetteer.

 
Kentucky counties
1819 establishments in Kentucky
Populated places established in 1819